William Victor Mahony  (born September 16, 1949) is a former breaststroke swimmer who represented Canada in multiple international championships from 1966 to 1974, including two Summer Olympics, the Pan American Games, and two Commonwealth Games.

Mahony began his international career at the 1966 Commonwealth Games in Jamaica, with a bronze medal in the 220-yard breaststroke.  In Mexico City for the 1968 Summer Olympics, he competed in the semifinals of the 100-metre breaststroke, the preliminary heats of the 200-metre breaststroke, and the finals of the men's 4×100-metre medley relay.

He attended the University of Michigan, where he swam for the Michigan Wolverines swimming and diving team in National Collegiate Athletic Association (NCAA) and Big Ten Conference competition from 1969 to 1971.  He received All-American honours during each of his three varsity seasons as a college swimmer in the States. Despite being of Canadian nationality he won the ASA National British Championships 220 yards breaststroke title in 1969.

At the 1970 Commonwealth Games in Edinburgh, he won three gold medals in the 100-metre and 200-metre breaststroke, and the 4×100-metre medley relay.  In Cali, Colombia for the 1971 Pan American Games, Mahony earned a silver medal as a member of Canada's 4×100-metre medley relay team.  At the 1972 Summer Olympics in Munich, West Germany, he won a bronze medal in the men's 4×100-metre medley relay, together with Canadian teammates Erik Fish, Bruce Robertson and Robert Kasting.

After taking a year off, in his final international event at the 1974 Commonwealth Games in Auckland, New Zealand, he won another gold medal swimming his lifetime fastest Breastroke leg for the Canadian team in the 4×100-metre medley relay, alongside Brian Phillips, Bruce Robertson and Steve Pickell.

From 1977 to 1987 he developed the Adapted Aquatics program at Variety's Treatment Centre in Surrey, British Columbia, and helped to form the British Columbia Branch of the Cerebral Palsy Sports Association.  Later, while coaching paraplegic and blind swimmers, he was selected to coach the Canadian swimmers at the 1980 Olympics for the Disabled in the Netherlands. He was awarded Athlete of the Year in New Westminster, and inducted into the BC Swimming Hall of Fame, Canadian Swimming Hall of Fame, and BC Sports Hall of Fame.

See also
 List of Commonwealth Games medallists in swimming (men)
 List of Olympic medalists in swimming (men)
 List of University of Michigan alumni

References

External links

 

1949 births
Living people
Canadian male breaststroke swimmers
Michigan Wolverines men's swimmers
Olympic bronze medalists for Canada
Olympic bronze medalists in swimming
Olympic swimmers of Canada
Sportspeople from New Westminster
Swimmers at the 1967 Pan American Games
Swimmers at the 1968 Summer Olympics
Swimmers at the 1971 Pan American Games
Swimmers at the 1972 Summer Olympics
Swimmers at the 1966 British Empire and Commonwealth Games
Swimmers at the 1970 British Commonwealth Games
Swimmers at the 1974 British Commonwealth Games
Commonwealth Games gold medallists for Canada
Commonwealth Games bronze medallists for Canada
University of British Columbia alumni
Medalists at the 1972 Summer Olympics
Pan American Games silver medalists for Canada
Commonwealth Games medallists in swimming
Pan American Games medalists in swimming
UBC Thunderbirds swimmers
Medalists at the 1967 Pan American Games
Medalists at the 1971 Pan American Games
Medallists at the 1966 British Empire and Commonwealth Games
Medallists at the 1970 British Commonwealth Games
Medallists at the 1974 British Commonwealth Games